Batu, officially the City of Batu, is a landlocked city in the East Java Province of Indonesia. It is about 20 km to the northwest of Malang. Formerly, it was a part of Malang Regency; but in 2001, Batu became an independent city legalized by Act No. 11 of 2001, when it became an independent municipal city with its own mayor and council.

With a population of 213,046 people at the 2020 Census, it lies on the southern slopes of Mount Arjuno-Welirang. Its population largely consists of Javanese. The town used to be a recreation place for the Dutch colonial officers in the Dutch colonial area (before 1945). Batu means "rock" in Indonesian.

History
Since the 10th century, the area of Batu and its surroundings has been known as a resting place for the royal family, because the region is a mountainous area with comfortable air, also supported by the beauty of natural scenery as a characteristic of mountainous regions.

During the reign of Mataram Kingdom under King Sindok, a royal official named Mpu Supo was ordered by the King to build a royal family resting place in the mountains with nearby water springs. With a hard effort, finally Mpu Supo discovered an area which is now better known as the tourist area of Songgoriti. With the approval of King Sindok, Mpu Supo began to build the Songgoriti area as a royal family retreat and built a temple named Supo Temple.

From some local community leaders, it has been told that the title Batu comes from the name of a cleric follower of Prince Diponegoro named Abu Ghonaim or referred to as the Kyai Gubug Angin which later the local community was familiar with calling it Mbah Wastu. From Javanese cultural habits that often shorten and shorten the designation of someone's name which is considered too long, also to make it shorter and faster when calling someone, finally Mbah Wastu is called Mbah Tu to be Mbatu or Batu as a term used for a mild climate city in East Java.

The history of Abu Ghonaim's existence as a forerunner and person known as a community leader who started the babad alas and was used as inspiration from the designation of the Batu region, in fact Abu Ghonaim himself was from the Central Java region. Abu Ghonaim as a loyal follower of Prince Diponegoro, intentionally left his native area of Central Java and moved to the hillside of Mount Panderman to avoid the pursuit and arrest of the Dutch soldiers (Kompeni). Abu Ghonaim or Mbah Wastu who started his new life together with the surrounding community. Finally, many residents and surrounding communities and other communities came around the residence of Mbah Wastu. Initially they lived in a group (community) in the Bumiaji, Sisir and Temas.

Geography
The city of Batu lies on the slopes of several mountains. The most prominent are Mount Anjasmoro (2,277 m), Mount Arjuno (3,339 m), Mount Welirang (3,156 m), Mount Banyak (1,306 m), Mount Kawi (2,551 m), Mount Panderman (2,045 m), Mount Semeru (3.676 m), and Mount Wukir (335 m). 

In the 19th century, the Dutch East Indies government developed Batu as a mountain resort. Villas and resort facilities were built in Batu during the period. Most of the topography of Batu city is dominated by highland and hilly terrain with valleys running down mountain slopes. In northern Batu, there is a dense forest, Raden Soerjo Forest Park, which is a protected forest area.  

Most soils in Batu city are andosols, sequentially present with cambisol, latosol and alluvial. These form mechanical soils which contain substantial amounts of minerals coming from volcanic eruptions. These soils tend to be very fertile.

Batu is a near-exact antipode (or polar opposite) to the city of San Fernando de Apure, Venezuela.

Climate 
The climate in Batu city at lower elevation (700-900 meters) features tropical monsoon climate (Am), and at higher elevation (900-1800 meters), the city's climate is classified by Köppen as subtropical highland climate (Cwb). The driest month is August with precipitation total 35 mm, while the wettest month is January with precipitation total 406 mm. The temperature is moderated by the altitude, as the city is located at average 953 meters above sea level. The hottest month is October with average 22.2 °C, while the coolest month is August with average 11.4 °C.

Administration
The city is divided into three districts (kecamatan), tabulated below with their areas and their populations at the 2010 Census and 2020 Census.

The districts are further subdivided into 24 urban villages (kelurahan).  The names of the urban villages are:

Batu District
 Ngaglik
 Oro-Oro Ombo (Rombo)
 Pesanggrahan
 Sidomulyo
 Sisir
 Songgokerto 
 Sumberejo
 Temas

Bumiaji district
 Bulukerto
 Bumiaji
 Giripurno
 Gunungsari
 Pandanrejo
 Punten
 Sumberbrantas
 Sumbergondo
 Tulungrejo

Junrejo district
 Beji
 Dadaprejo
 Junrejo
 Mojorejo
 Pendem
 Tlekung
 Torongrejo

Economy
The economy of Batu City is highly dependent on tourism and agriculture. The location of Batu City which is in the mountainous region and rapid tourism development makes most of the GDP growth in Batu depended by this sector. In agriculture, Batu is one of the largest apple-producing regions in Indonesia, which makes it dubbed "The City of Apples". Apple agriculture in Batu has four varieties, there are "Manalagi", "Rome Beauty", "Anna", and "Wangling". Also the city produces a lot of vegetables, and garlic. Besides that, Batu is also an artist city where there are many painting and art galleries in this city.

Batu has several shopping centers ranging from modern shopping centers to modern and traditional markets. Among the most famous modern shopping centers are Lippo Plaza Batu and Plaza Batu, while the famous traditional market in Batu is Pasar Batu. In addition, there is also a floating market in Batu called the Nusantara Floating Market which makes it the first floating market in East Java. The Nusantara Floating Market Complex is a unit of the Museum Angkut tourism complex in Batu.

Tourism
Batu is well known for its tourism sites. Some are:

 Cuban Rondo Waterfall
 Jatim Park (Jawa Timur Park): a place for learning and playing. 
 Jatim Park 2
 Jatim Park 3

 Selecta Pool and Hotel
 BNS: Batu Night Spectacular
 Alun-Alun Batu
 Eco-Green Park

 Museum Angkut
 Pasar Parkiran
 Paralayang Gunung Banyak
 Coban Pitu

There is a historic colonial-style hotel, the Kartika Wijaya. It was founded in 1891 by the Sarkies Brothers, prominent Armenian immigrants best known for founding a chain of luxury hotels throughout Southeast Asia, especially the Dutch East Indies. Originally built as a vacation villa for the Sarkies family, it was later turned into a hotel.

References

External links

  
 
 BPS

 
Populated places in East Java